Brandon Camp is an archaeological site, about 1 mile south of Leintwardine, in Herefordshire. England. It is a hillfort of the Iron Age, which later became a Roman fort. The site is a scheduled monument.

Description
The visible defences consist of a single bank forming a roughly triangular enclosure, with rounded angles and slightly curved sides, on the western side of Brandon Hill. The shape of the hill has determined the  location of the defences. There is a precipitous slope on the north-west side, thought to have been artificially steepened. There is a clearly defined rampart on the east and south sides. An entrance on the north side, which has been widened, is probably original; there is an entrance on the east side, also widened, and a modern entrance on the south.

Cropmarks and excavation
Aerial photographs taken in 1959 and 1965 showed cropmarks inside the defences, in particular a rectangular area  just inside the eastern entrance, thought to be a Roman granary. Aerial photographs of 1965 and 1976 showed that the original Iron Age fort probably occupied most of the hilltop; this suggested that the visible defences date from the Roman period and that, like Hod Hill in Dorset, a Roman fort was built on a captured British fort.

The features seen were investigated by excavation in the early 1980s by Sheppard Frere and J. K. St Joseph. The presence of the granary was confirmed. Immediately to the west were three widely separated canabae, two-roomed huts thought to be accommodation for officers. There were nine huts to the north, spaced more closely together, on either side of what may have been a road. A large circular feature seen as crop-marks  on aerial photographs was found to be a Bronze Age ring ditch; nearby there was an Iron Age enclosure ditch. These were partly overlaid by a group of buildings around three sides of a courtyard, with other buildings adjacent to this. The area was interpreted as a combined Roman praetorium (commandant's house) and principia (regimental headquarters). There were finds including shards of Samian ware dating from the reign of Nero.

References

Hill forts in Herefordshire
Roman sites in England
Scheduled monuments in Herefordshire
Archaeological sites in Herefordshire